The Alien Within is a 1995 horror science fiction film directed by Scott P. Levy and starring Roddy McDowall, Alex Hyde-White, Melanie Shatner, Don Stroud, and Richard Biggs. It was also known as Unknown Origin.

Plot

At a future (2020) underwater mining platform, an alien parasite. dubbed the "vampire bug,"  plagues  the crew of the platform.

Production
Produced by Roger Corman as part of Roger Corman Presents.

Reception

Creature Feature gave the movie 3 out of 5 stars. It found the movie to be a mixture of Trancers, Alien (film). The Abyss and The Thing (1982 film). It praised the script by Alex Simon for keeping the movie interesting. It was not as enamored with Scott Levy's direction.

References

External links

The Alien Within at Letter Box
The Alien Within at Reelzchannel.com

1995 horror films
1990s science fiction horror films
American science fiction horror films
American science fiction television films
American horror television films
Films scored by Christopher Lennertz
Films directed by Scott P. Levy
1990s English-language films
1990s American films